Valavaikkal  is a river flowing in the Tiruvarur district of the Indian state of Tamil Nadu.

References

See also 
List of rivers of Tamil Nadu

Rivers of Tamil Nadu
Tiruvarur district
Rivers of India